Qutaylah bint ʿAbd al-ʿUzzā, was the first wife of Abu Bakr.

She was a member of the Amir ibn Luayy clan of the Quraysh in Mecca. Her marriage to Abu Bakr  produced two children, Asmā' and Abd Allah.  Soon before or soon after Abd Allah's birth, Abu Bakr divorced Qutaylah. It was after this that Abu Bakr converted to Islam; Qutaylah remained a polytheist.

Seven years after their daughter Asmā' had migrated from Mecca, Qutaylah came to visit her in Medina. She brought gifts of raisins, clarified butter and qaraz (pods of a species of the sant tree). However, Asmā' did not admit her mother into her house or accept the gifts until she had sent someone to Aisha to ask Muhammad about what her attitude to her unbelieving mother should be. He replied that she should certainly admit her to her house and accept the gifts.

This was the occasion for the first reciting of the following verse of the Qur'an:

See also
Sahaba

References

External links
http://www.geocities.com/mutmainaa/people/umm_ruman.html
https://web.archive.org/web/20050611082507/http://www.geocities.com/mutmainaa/people/asma.html
http://www.jannah.org/sisters/asma.html

Abu Bakr family